Bước nhảy hoàn vũ 2013 was the fourth season of Bước nhảy hoàn vũ produced by Vietnam Television and Cat Tien Sa Productions based upon the BBC Worldwide's Dancing with the Stars. The judges were Khánh Thi, Lê Hoàng and Trần Ly Ly. Each week they were joined by a guest judge.

Couples

Scores

Red numbers indicate the lowest score for each week.
Green numbers indicate the highest score for each week.
 indicates the couple eliminated that week.
 indicates the returning couple that finished in the bottom two.
 indicates the winning couple (the couple that received the highest combined total of judges' scores and viewers' votes).
 indicates the runner-up couple.
 indicates the third-place couple.
 indicates the couple that won the previous episode and gained immunity for the week.

Averages 
This table only counts dances scored on the traditional 40-points scale. Week 1 scores were adjusted to be out of 40.

Highest and lowest scoring performances 
The best and worst performances in each dance according to the judges' marks are as follows:

Couples' Highest and Lowest Scoring Dances

According to the traditional 40-point scale:

Songs and Individual Scoring
Unless indicated otherwise, individual judges scores in the charts below (given in parentheses) are listed in this order from left to right: Guest judge, Trần Ly Ly, Lê Hoàng, Khánh Thi.

Week 1
Individual judges scores in the charts below (given in parentheses) are listed in this order from left to right: Trần Ly Ly, Lê Hoàng, Khánh Thi.
Running order

Week 2
 Guest judge: Cao Thị Đoan Trang, singer, season 1 runner-up and former co-host.
Individual judges scores in the charts below (given in parentheses) are listed in this order from left to right: Cao Thị Đoan Trang, Trần Ly Ly, Lê Hoàng, Khánh Thi.
Running order

Week 3
 Guest judge: Trần Thị Thủy Tiên, singer, season 2 runner-up.
Individual judges scores in the charts below (given in parentheses) are listed in this order from left to right: Trần Thị Thủy Tiên, Trần Ly Ly, Lê Hoàng, Khánh Thi.
Running order

Week 4: Opponents' Choice Week
 Guest judge: Lê Ngọc Minh Hằng, singer and actress, season 3 champion.
Individual judges scores in the charts below (given in parentheses) are listed in this order from left to right: Lê Ngọc Minh Hằng, Trần Ly Ly, Lê Hoàng, Khánh Thi.
Running order

Week 5: Folk Week
 Guest judge: Cao Thị Đoan Trang, singer, season 1 runner-up and former co-host.
Individual judges scores in the charts below (given in parentheses) are listed in this order from left to right: Cao Thị Đoan Trang, Trần Ly Ly, Lê Hoàng, Khánh Thi.
Running order

Week 6: Broadway Week
 Guest judge: Trương Nam Thành, model, season 3 runner-up.
Individual judges scores in the charts below (given in parentheses) are listed in this order from left to right: Trương Nam Thành, Trần Ly Ly, Lê Hoàng, Khánh Thi.
Running order

Week 7: Fusion Week
 Guest judge: Việt Tú, director.
 Note: The couple who earns the highest combined total of judges' scores and viewers' votes this week will gain immunity for the next week and will go straight through to the semi-finals.

Individual judges scores in the charts below (given in parentheses) are listed in this order from left to right: Việt Tú, Trần Ly Ly, Lê Hoàng, Khánh Thi.
Running order

Week 8: Trio Challenge Week
 Guest judge: Trần Thị Thủy Tiên, singer, season 2 runner-up.
 Note: Yến Trang & Tihomir, who earned the highest combined total of judges' scores and viewers' votes last week, are immune this week. Their dances this week will not be scored and the audience will not be able to vote for them. They will go straight through to next week.

Individual judges scores in the charts below (given in parentheses) are listed in this order from left to right: Trần Thị Thủy Tiên, Trần Ly Ly, Lê Hoàng, Khánh Thi.
Running order

Week 9: Semi-Finals
 Guest judge: Lê Ngọc Minh Hằng, singer and actress, season 3 champion.
Individual judges scores in the charts below (given in parentheses) are listed in this order from left to right: Lê Ngọc Minh Hằng, Trần Ly Ly, Lê Hoàng, Khánh Thi.
Running order

Week 10: Finals
 Guest judge: Cao Thị Đoan Trang, singer, season 1 runner-up and former co-host.
Individual judges scores in the charts below (given in parentheses) are listed in this order from left to right: Cao Thị Đoan Trang, Trần Ly Ly, Lê Hoàng, Khánh Thi.
Running order

Other performances

Dance chart 
The celebrities and professional partners danced one of these routines for each corresponding week:
 Week 1: One unlearned dance
 Week 2: Cha-cha-cha or Waltz or Jive or Quickstep
 Week 3: Paso Doble or Rumba or Tango
 Week 4: One unlearned dance from week 2 or 3 (Opponents' Choice Week)
 Week 5: One unlearned Latin dance with elements of a folk dance
 Week 6: Broadway dance
 Week 7: One dance of two combined styles (Fusion) and Swing marathon
 Week 8: Argentine Tango and a Trio dance
 Week 9: Samba and a Fusion or Freestyle dance to Michael Jackson's music
 Week 10: Judges' choice dance and Freestyle

 Highest scoring dance
 Lowest scoring dance
 Danced, but not scored

References

External links 
Bước nhảy hoàn vũ's official site

Bước nhảy hoàn vũ
2010s Vietnamese television series
2013 Vietnamese television seasons